A list of cases involving Lord Denning is bound to be incomplete, since he delivered around 2000 reported judgments. Lord Denning served as a judge for nearly 40 years, from 1944 to 1982. He often played a decisive role in developing the law and was influential around the Commonwealth and common law world.

Counsel
L'Estrange v F Graucob Ltd [1934] 2 KB 394

High Court
Fletcher v Fletcher [1945] 1 All ER 582, 61 TLR 354, Denning approves the divorce of a husband who deserted wife by withdrawing sexual intercourse and joining a religious community.
Central London Property Trust Ltd v High Trees House Ltd [1947] KB 130, Denning resurrects the lost doctrine of promissory estoppel.

Court of Appeal
Hain Steampship Co Ltd v Minister of Food [1949] 1 All ER 444 (C.A.)
Olley v Marlborough Court Hotel [1949] 1 KB 532, on exclusion clauses in contract law.
Metropolitan Borough and the Town Clerk of Lewisham v Roberts [1949] 2 K.B. 608 (C.A.) — Dissenting, an executive body should not be allowed to gain title of a man's land if only possession was required for their purpose.
Solle v Butcher [1950] 1 KB 671, introducing equitable mistake, whereby a contract may be voidable if both parties have made a serious mistake
Leaf v International Galleries [1950] 2 KB 86, in the event of lapse of too much time between the making of the contract and the decision to rescind, the right to rescind is lost
Curtis v Chemical Cleaning & Dyeing Co [1951] 1 KB 805, established that the rule that a party is bound by the terms of a document which the party has signed will not apply where the signature was induced by misrepresentation, fraud, or in some cases of mistake. 
Candler v Crane, Christmas & Co [1951] 2 KB 164, on negligent misstatement, later adopted by the House of Lords in Hedley Byrne v Heller
Errington v Errington (1951) KB, creating the equitable doctrine of "part performance" to save an incomplete contract.
Combe v Combe (1952), elaborating stance on promissory estoppel, calling it a "shield", not a "sword".
R v Northumberland Compensation Tribunal, ex parte Shaw (1952)
Hoenig v Isaacs [1952] EWCA Civ 6 i
Barnard v National Dock Labour Board (1953)
Frederick E Rose (London) Ltd v William H Pim Junior & Co Ltd [1953] 2 QB 450
Drive-Yourself-Hire v Strutt [1953] 2 All ER 1475
Roe v Minister of Health [1954] 2 All ER 131
Ladd v Marshall [1954] EWCA Civ 1
Entores Ltd v Miles Far East Corporation [1955] 2 All ER 493 — Decides that the "moment of acceptance" in a contract using a telex (electronic communication) happens on the receiver's side.
Ward v Byham (1956)
Hornal v Neuberger [1956]
J Spurling Ltd v Bradshaw [1956] 1 WLR 461
Miller v Jackson [QB 966 1977]

House of Lords
Scottish Co-operative Wholesale Society Ltd v Meyer [1959] AC 324, on the predecessor to unfair prejudice in UK company law
Scruttons Ltd v Midland Silicones Ltd [1962] AC 446, dissenting over the privity of contract doctrine.
Fairweather v St Marylebone Property Co Ltd [1963] AC 510 (decided 16 April 1962, the last case in the HL) concerning adverse possession

Master of the Rolls
In re Smith or Barclays Bank Ltd v Mercantile Bank Ltd [1962] 1 WLR 763, decided on 1 May 1962, reversed the decision of Wilberforce J that a trust requiring trustees to give money to "hospitals" could be construed as "non-profit" hospitals, so was not void for uncertainty.
Boulting v Association of Cinematograph, Television and Allied Technicians [1963] 2 QB 606, dissenting over a closed shop agreement and managers refusing to pay union fees
Roles v Nathan [1963] 1 WLR 1117, occupiers' liability case on chimney sweeps.
Letang v Cooper [1964] 2 All ER 292
Southam v Smout [1964] 1QB 308
Ward v James [1965]
D & C Builders Ltd v Rees [1965] 2 QB 617, To resolve a debt there must be "accord and satisfaction" where the agreement cannot be made under duress.
 Beswick v Beswick [1966] Ch 538, Denning allows a poor widow to reclaim the assets of her late husband when it was taken from her husband's nephew (disapproved in [1968] AC 58).
 Morris v CW Martin & Sons Ltd [1966] 1 QB 716
Wheat v E Lacon & Co Ltd [1966] 1 All ER 582; defines "occupier" for the purposes of Occupiers' Liability Act 1957.
Boardman v Phipps [1965] Ch 992, on the strict application of the no conflict of interest rule for trustees, affirmed by the House of Lords.
ER Ives Investments Ltd v High [1967] 2 QB 379
Anglo Continental Holidays Ltd v Typaldos Lines (London) Ltd [1967] 2 Lloyd's Rep 61, ruled that a steamship line could not cite a clause in its passage contract to radically alter the substance and intent of the contract.
Gallie v Lee [1968] 2 All ER 322
O'Brien v Associated Fire Alarms Ltd [1969] 1 WLR 1916
Torquay Hotel Co Ltd v Cousins [1969] 2 Ch 106, on the new economic tort of "interference with a contract"
Gould v Gould [1970] 1 QB 275, dissenting on the idea that a husband's promise to help out his wife "as long as [he is] able" should be enforceable.
Hinz v Berry [1970] 2 QB 40, on the recoverability of damages for nervous shock. Denning's judgment began with the words, "It happened on April 19, 1964. It was bluebell time in Kent."
Lewis v Averay (1971), the purchaser of stolen goods should not bear the costs of re-embursing the victim of theft.
Thornton v Shoe Lane Parking Ltd [1971] 2 QB 163
Broome v Cassell & Co Ltd [1971] 2 QB 354, compensatory damages. Led to strong rebuke by Lord Hailsham in the House of Lords.
Nettleship v Weston [1971] 3 All ER 581, a learner driver must exercise the skill of an experienced driver to avoid liability in negligence.
WJ Allan & Co v El Nasr Export & Import Co [1972] 2 QB 189
Fuller v Fuller [1973] 1 WLR 730, changed divorce law. Married couples are only cohabiting if they are living with each other as husband and wife.
Spartan Steel & Alloys Ltd v Martin & Co (Contractors) Ltd [1973] 1 QB 27, concerning the recovery of pure economic loss in negligence.
Jarvis v Swans Tours Ltd [1973] QB 233
Lloyds Bank Ltd v Bundy (1975) QB
Courtney and Fairbairn Ltd v Tolaini Brothers (Hotels) Ltd [1975] 1 All ER 716, a contract cannot have terms that are to be negotiated on at a later point.
British Crane Hire Corporation Ltd v Ipswich Plant Hire Ltd [1975] QB 303
Liverpool City Council v Irwin [1976] UKHL 1
Anton Piller KG v Manufacturing Processes Limited [1976] Ch 55
Rose v Plenty [1976] 1 WLR 141
R v Secretary of State for the Home Department, ex parte, Hosenball [1977] 1 W.L.R. 766; [1977] 3 All E.R. 452
BBC v Hearn [1977] ICR 686
Miller v Jackson [1977] QB 966, that cricket was in the public interest and stray cricket balls were not a nuisance.
Esso Petroleum Co Ltd v Mardon [1976] QB 801, representations made by parties with expert knowledge and experience are warranties in a contract.
British Railways Board v Customs and Excise Comrs [1977] STC 221, [1977] 2 All ER 873, zero rating for VAT purposes is a question of law not fact.
 Gouriet v Union of Post Office Workers and Others [1977] CA, "Be you ever so high, the law is above you."
Parsons (Livestock) Ltd v Uttley Ingham & Co Ltd [1978] QB 791
Butler Machine Tool Co Ltd v Ex-Cell-O Corp Ltd [1979] 1 All ER, battle of the forms case, where Denning argued the mirror image rule for offer and acceptance is outdated.
Brikom Investments v Carr [1979]
 Quennell v Maltby [1979] WLR 318, asserted that equity conferred a wide, previously unrecognised, discretion to restrain the mortgagee from exercising the right to possession for purposes other than the protection or enforcement of his security.
Science Research Council v. Nasse [1979] QB 144, comparison of Commission for Racial Equality to inquisition
Photo Productions v Securicor Ltd [1980] All ER 556
Ahmad v United Kingdom (1982) 4 EHRR 126
Attorney General of New Zealand v Ortiz [1982] 3 WLR 570; [1982] 3 All ER 432, beautiful scene setting description of the Maori treasure at the heart of this case.
Mandla v Dowell-Lee [1983] QB 1, saying that Sikhs were not a racial group under the Race Relations Act 1975, overturned by the House of Lords
George Mitchell (Chesterhall) Ltd v Finney Lock Seeds Ltd [1982] 3 WLR 1036, classic opener with a quote from Lewis Carroll, later on is his infamous speech on the worship of the idol of "freedom of contract". Seed merchants could not rely on damage limitation clause to just the cost of the seeds. This was Lord Denning's last published decision, delivered on 29 September 1982.

See also
English contract law
English tort law
English property law
English trusts law

Denning
United Kingdom law-related lists